Eileen Abad (born November 15, 1973 in Caracas, Venezuela) is a Venezuelan actress and model who has acted in several telenovelas and films.

Biography 
Abad studied drama at the Escuela de Artes Escénicas Juana Sujo. Her work in Venezuelan as well as Mexican and Colombian telenovelas has gained her recognition. Some of the most famous productions she took part in included Por estas calles, Amores de fin de siglo, Contra viento y marea, Calipso, Niña Mimada, El amor de mi vida (TV Azteca).

Among the awards she has received are Las Palmas de Oro (best performance, 99 México), Premio Nacional Casa del Artista as a young actress of the year (1998) and second in La Orden Francisco Fajardo.

She has participated in many big screen productions like Un tiro en la espalda (1995), Tokyo Paraguaipoa (1996), Entre mentiras (1996) Piel (1998) and Puras Joyitas (2007) are some of the highlights.

In 2010 she acted in the Telemundo series La Reina del Sur filmed in Miami, Mexico, Colombia and Morocco

Filmography 
Films
 Un Tiro en la Espalda
 Tokyo Paraguaipoa
 Antes de Morir
 La Primera Vez
 Piel
 Entre Mentiras 
 Puras Joyitas

Telenovelas

List of Unitarians 
She has performed at Unitarian comedies like
La Madre María de San José
Doble Vida
Felizmente Casada
La Confesión
Sagrada Familia
Leonor
La Vida es una Cebolla
desiciones

Theatre
Intriga y Amor (Schiller) as Lady Milford,
El Casamiento Forzoso (Molière) as Dorimea
Las Preciosas Ridículas (Molière) as Madelón
La Señorita Julia (August Strimbert) as Julia
Fuenteovejuna (Lope De Vega) as Laurencia
La Hora Menguada (Romulo Gallegos) as Enriqueta
''Altitud 3200 (Julien Lucharle) as Zizi

Modeling 
Eileen Abad has had a successful modeling career both in her native country and in other Latin American publications and specially in Mexico.

References

External links
 
 Instagram Official
 Twitter Official
 Myspace

1973 births
Living people
Actresses from Caracas
Venezuelan film actresses
Venezuelan telenovela actresses
Venezuelan stage actresses
20th-century Venezuelan actresses
21st-century Venezuelan actresses